James Bayard Turner (born March 28, 1941) is a former American football player.  A quarterback and placekicker, he played college football for Utah State University and was signed as a free agent in 1964 by the American Football League's New York Jets head coach Weeb Ewbank. "Tank" kicked a then record 145 points in the 1968 regular season, with a professional football record 34 field goals.  Turner kicked for nine points in the AFL Championship game win over the Oakland Raiders, and ten points in the Jets's 16-7 defeat of the Baltimore Colts in the Third World Championship of Professional Football, Super Bowl III.

The last of Turner's three field goals in Super Bowl III was for 9 yards, the shortest in Super Bowl history (which Mike Clark of the Dallas Cowboys tied in Super Bowl VI): at that time, the goal posts were located at the front of the end zones. As the goal posts were moved to the back of the end zones in 1974, it is currently impossible to equal or beat this record: the shortest field goal distance under the current rules is 17 yards.

Following the AFL-NFL merger, Turner also played with the Denver Broncos for another nine seasons and kicked four points in a losing effort in Super Bowl XII against the Dallas Cowboys, connecting on a 47-yard field goal and an extra point following a 5-yard touchdown run by Rob Lytle. He was inducted into the Denver Broncos Ring of Fame in 1988.

Turner finished his career with 304 of 488 (62%) field goals and 521 of 534 extra points, giving him 1,439 total points.  At the time of his retirement, his 304 field goals made were the most in NFL history.

In the "Heidi game" of 1968, Turner was responsible for the final two plays before the NBC television network infamously cut away to a TV movie. Turner kicked a tiebreaking 26-yard field goal to put the Jets up, 32-29, with 1:05 remaining in the game. Turner then kicked off to the Raiders and Charlie Smith returned the ball to the Oakland 22-yard line with 1:01 left. The broadcast operations center went to a 60-second commercial break and then began airing the movie as viewers missed the final two touchdowns that led to a 43-32 Raiders comeback win.

In the early 1980s, Turner worked as a color commentary sportscaster on NBC.

See also
 Other American Football League players
 List of most consecutive starts and games played by National Football League players

References

External links
NFL.com player page
Turner's stats at databasefootball.com

1941 births
Living people
American Football League All-Star players
American Football League All-Time Team
American football placekickers
Denver Broncos players
National Football League announcers
New York Jets players
People from Martinez, California
Utah State Aggies football players
Players of American football from California
Sportspeople from the San Francisco Bay Area
American Football League players